Impact Wrestling is a professional wrestling promotion based in Nashville, Tennessee. Impact Wrestling personnel consists of professional wrestlers, managers, play-by-play and color commentators, ring announcers, interviewers, referees, trainers, producers, script writers, and various other positions. Executives are listed as well.

Active wrestlers and on-screen talent appear on Impact, pay-per-views and at untelevised live events. Personnel are organized below by their role in Impact Wrestling. Their ring name is on the left, and their real name is on the right. Impact Wrestling refers to its female performers as "Knockouts".

Impact Wrestling has partnerships with various national and international promotions, such as Japan's New Japan Pro-Wrestling (NJPW),, and Mexico's Lucha Libre AAA Worldwide (AAA). As such, wrestlers from these companies may also make periodic appearances on Impact programming, and Impact recognizes when one of their wrestlers holds a championship from a partner promotion.

The U.S. based Ohio Valley Wrestling (OVW), and the Canadian based Border City Wrestling (BCW) serve as developmental territories for Impact Wrestling, therefore OVW and BCW talent may also periodically appear on Impact as well.

Roster

Men's division

Women's division (Knockouts)

Other on-air personnel

Referees

Broadcast team

Producers

Executives

See also 
List of current champions in Impact Wrestling
List of former Impact Wrestling personnel
List of professional wrestling rosters

Notes

References

External links 
Impact Wrestling's roster at ImpactWrestling.com

Lists of professional wrestling personnel
Impact Wrestling